The Jacob C. Spores House was a house located between south of Coburg and north of Eugene, Oregon, which was formerly listed on the National Register of Historic Places. It was removed from the register on August 1, 2001. The classical revival house underwent an "exceptional" restoration in 1975, but a September 1996 fire "destroyed most, if not all, of the historical value of the house". By 1998 the owners were again restoring the house, but according to the Oregon State Historic Preservation office, as of 2013 the house has been demolished.

Jacob Spores was an early settler of the Coburg area, who started the first ferry across the McKenzie River at the site. The house was thought to be the oldest in Lane County.

See also
 Historic ferries in Oregon
 National Register of Historic Places listings in Lane County, Oregon

References

External links
Images of the Jacob C. Spores House from the University of Oregon digital collections
Biography of Jacob C. Spores from the Springfield Museum

1854 establishments in Oregon Territory
Former National Register of Historic Places in Oregon
Houses completed in 1854
Houses in Lane County, Oregon
Neoclassical architecture in Oregon